Qandilak (also Romanized as Qandīlak; also known as Gandīlak and Qandīnak) is a village in Kaftarak Rural District, in the Central District of Shiraz County, Fars Province, Iran. At the 2006 census, its population was 122, in 29 families.

References 

Populated places in Shiraz County